Pakistan as a developing country is struggling in many domains due to which the health system has suffered a lot.  As a result of that, Pakistan is ranked 122nd out of 190 countries in the World Health Organization performance report. Pakistan ranks 154th among 195 countries in terms of quality and accessibility of healthcare, according to a Lancet study. According to the study Pakistan has seen improvement in healthcare access and quality since 1990, with its HAQ index increasing from 26.8 in 1990 to 37.6 in 2016. Pakistan per capita income (PPP current international $, 2013) is 4,920 and the total expenditure on health per capita (intl $, 2014) is $129, which is only 2.6% of GDP (2014). The gender inequality in Pakistan is 0.536 and ranks the country 147 out of 188 countries (2004). The total adult literacy rate in Pakistan is 55% (2014) and primary school enrolment is 73%. Life expectancy at birth is 68 years (Male 65.8, female 67.9), Pakistan's population is around 185 million out of which more than 70 million people are living below the poverty line. The proportion of population which has access to improved drinking water and sanitation is 91% (2015) and 64% (15) respectively.

Expenditure in health Pakistan in 2018 was mostly Out of Pocket spending (OOPS), which is around 56.2% followed by the Government health spending.g 35.5%.

The Human Rights Measurement Initiative finds that Pakistan is fulfilling 69.2% of what it should be fulfilling for the right to health based on its level of income. When looking at the right to health with respect to children, Pakistan achieves 82.9% of what is expected based on its current income. In regards to the right to health amongst the adult population, the country achieves 90.4% of what is expected based on the nation's level of income.  Pakistan falls into the "very bad" category when evaluating the right to reproductive health because the nation is fulfilling only 34.4% of what the nation is expected to achieve based on the resources (income) it has available.

Health infrastructure 

In keeping with the increased awareness regarding health services Ministry of National Health Services, Regulations and Coordination was formed in 2011. The main purpose of establishing this body was to provide a health system that gives access to efficient, equitable, accessible & affordable health services. And also, national and international coordination in the field of public health along with population welfare coordination. It also enforced drug laws and regulations.  The health care delivery system includes both state and non-state; and profit and not for profit service provision. The country's health sector is marked by urban-rural disparities in healthcare delivery and an imbalance in the health workforce, with insufficient health managers, nurses, paramedics and skilled birth attendants in the peripheral areas.

Primary Health Care
Primary Healthcare system is the very basic health system for providing accessible, good-quality, responsive, equitable and integrated care. Primary healthcare in Pakistan mainly consists of basic health units, dispensaries, Maternal & child health centers (MNCH) and some private clinics at community level. In Sindh (Province in Pakistan), Primary healthcare activities are supported by  government itself but managed by external private & non-government organizations like People's primary healthcare initiative (PPHI Sindh), Shifa foundation, HANDS etc.

Secondary Health Care
It mainly includes tehsil & district hospitals or some private hospitals. Tehsil & district hospitals (THQs & DHQs) are run by the government, the treatment under government hospitals is free of cost.

Tertiary Health Care
It include both private and government hospitals, well equipped to perform minor and major surgeries. There are usually two or more in every city. Most of the Class “A” military hospitals come in this category. Healthcare and stay comes free of charge in government hospitals.  There is also a 24 hours emergency care that usually caters to more than 350 patients every day.

Other health related services
The government of Pakistan has also started “Sehat Sahulat Program”, whose vision is to work towards social welfare reforms, guaranteeing that the lower class within the country gets access to basic medical care without financial risks.
Apart from that there are also maternal and child health centres run by lady health workers that aim towards family planning and reproductive health.

Health status

Communicable diseases

Communicable diseases have always been the prime cause of mortalities in Pakistan. The reason for the rapid spread of these diseases include overcrowded cities, unsafe drinking water, inadequate sanitation, poor socioeconomic conditions, low health awareness and inadequate vaccination coverage. 
 
Acute respiratory infection (51%): Among the victims of ARI, most vulnerable are children whose immune systems have been weakened by malnutrition. In 1990, National ARI Control Programme was started in order to reduce the mortality concerned with pneumonia and other respiratory diseases. In following three years, death rates among victims under age of five in Islamabad had been reduced to half. In 2006, there were 16,056,000 reported cases of ARI, out of which 25.6% were children under age of five.
Viral hepatitis (7.5%): Viral Hepatitis, particularly that caused by types B and C are major epidemics in Pakistan. Pakistan has the world's second highest prevalence of hepatitis C, with Egypt topping the list. Survey done in 2007 found that close to 7% of people in the biggest province of the country had hepatitis C, while around 5% of people were infected in the entire country. Pakistan remains in the intermediate prevalence area for Hepatitis B with an estimated prevalence rate of 2.5%.  The main cause remains massive overuse of therapeutic injections and re-use of syringes during these injections in the private sector healthcare.
Tuberculosis: According to National Institute of Health presently the prevalence of TB in Pakistan is 348 per 100,000. Whereas, number of new cases are reportedly 276 per 100,000 population. National TB Control Program (NTP) was renewed by Ministry of Health subsequent to declare TB as a national emergency in Pakistan in 2001 and is currently working along with National Institute of Health, Pakistan. The country is said to have the fourth highest prevalence of multidrug-resistant TB (MDR-TB) globally.  Factors causing this are delayed diagnosis, unsupervised, improper drug regimens, lack of follow-up and little or no social support programme.
Malaria (16%): It is a problem faced by the lower-class people in Pakistan. The unsanitary conditions and stagnant water bodies in the rural areas and city slums provide excellent breeding grounds for mosquitoes. Use of nets and mosquito repellents is becoming more common. Almost 177 million are at risk of malaria, with 3.5 million presumed and confirmed malaria cases annually. Pakistan is classified as a moderate malaria endemic country. Plasmodium Vivax and Plasmodium Falciparum are the only prevalent species of parasites detected so far, with P.vivax being the major parasite species responsible for >80% reported confirmed cases. In Pakistan, malarial incidence reaches its peak in September. 1000 million people have died from Malaria since Pakistan came into being till December 2012. In 2006, there were around 4,390,000 new reported cases of fever.
Diarrhea (15%): There were around 4,500,000 reported cases in 2006, 14% of which were children under the age of five.
Dysentery (8%) and Scabies (7%)
Coronavirus: As per statistics published by world o meter, almost 326,431 cases were reported till November, 2020. Out of these cases, there were 7,000 casualties and most of them were older people. However, Pakistan managed to avoid too much cases by taking COVID-19 precautionary measures at the early stage. 
Noncommunicable diseases

Non-communicable diseases such as cardiovascular problems, diabetes, cancer and coronary heart disease share 20.5% the burden of diseases and 2.5% are disabled. They account for 58% of all deaths in the country. Pakistan has a high prevalence of blindness, with nearly 1% by WHO criteria for visual impairment – mainly due to cataract. Disability from blindness profoundly affects poverty, education and overall quality of life.

Controllable diseases 
 Cholera: As of 2006, there were a total of 4,610 cases of suspected cholera. However, the floods of 2010 suggested that cholera transmission may be more prevalent than previously understood. Furthermore, research from the Aga Khan University suggests that cholera may account for a quarter of all childhood diarrhea in some parts of rural Sindh.
 Dengue fever: An outbreak of dengue fever occurred in October 2006 in Pakistan. Several deaths occurred due to misdiagnosis, late treatment and lack of awareness in the local population. But overall, steps were taken to kill vectors for the fever and the disease was controlled later, with minimal casualties.
 Measles: As of 2008, there were a total of 441 reported cases of measles in Pakistan.
 Meningococcal meningitis: As of 2006, there were a total of 724 suspected cases of Meningococcal meningitis.

Poliomyelitis

Pakistan is one of the few countries in which poliomyelitis has not been eradicated. As of 2008, there were a total of 89 reported cases of polio in Pakistan. Polio cases may be on an increase. The total count of polio cases in the country reached nine in 2018. World Health Organization (WHO) Director General Dr Tedros Adhanom Ghebreyesus said “Pakistan also needs to stop transmission of the virus from Afghanistan. Our New Year’s wish is ‘zero’ polio by end of 2019. The children of Pakistan and the children of the world deserve nothing less. Failure to eradicate polio would result in global resurgence of the disease, with as many as 200,000 new cases every year, all over the world.”

HIV/AIDS

Pakistan is one of the countries in the Eastern Mediterranean Region in which HIV infections are increasing at an alarming level since 1987. The former National AIDS Control Programme (it was developed with the Health Ministry) and the UNAIDS states that there are an estimated 97,000 HIV positive individuals in Pakistan. However, these figures are based on dated opinions and inaccurate assumptions; and are inconsistent with available national surveillance data which suggest that the overall number may closer to 40,000. From 25 April through 28 June 2019, a total of 30,192 people were screened for HIV, of which 876 were found to be positive. There are several risk factors for that which include unsafe intravenous injections during medical procedures; unsafe child delivery practices; unsafe practices at blood banks; poorly implemented infection control programs; and improper collection, storage, segregation and disposal of hospital waste.

Cancer
Pakistan has the highest rate of Breast Cancer among all Asian countries as approximately 90000 new cases are diagnosed every year out of which 40000 die. Young women usually present at advanced stage of breast cancer, which has negative effect on prognosis.
Oral cavity and gastrointestinal cancers continue to be extremely common in both genders. Lung and prostate cancer are comparatively less common. Ovarian cancer also has high prevalence.

Skin Diseases
Eczema is the most common skin disease in Pakistan, followed by dermatological infections including bacterial, viral, fungal, sexually transmitted infections, drug reactions, urticarial and psoriasis.

Family planning

"The government of Pakistan wants to stabilize the population (achieve zero growth rate) by 2020. And maximizing the usage of family planning methods is one of the pillars of the population program". The latest Pakistan Demographic and Health Survey (PDHS) conducted by Macro International with partnership of National Institute of Population Studies (NIPS) registered family planning usage in Pakistan to be 30 percent. While this shows an overall increase from 12 percent in 1990-91 (PDHS 1990–91), 8% of these are users of traditional methods.

Approximately 7 million women use any form of family planning and the number of urban family planning users have remained nearly static between 1990 and 2007. Since many contraception users are sterilized (38%), the actual number of women accessing any family planning services in a given year are closer to 3 million with over half buying either condoms or pills from stores directly. Government programs by either the Health or Population ministries together combine to reach less than 1 million users annually. Demographic transition of Pakistan has been delayed by slow onset of fertility decline, with a total fertility rate of 3.8 children per woman - 31 per cent higher than the desired rate.

Some of the main factors that account for this lack of progress with Family Planning include inadequate programs that do not meet the needs of women who desire family planning. Also, there is a lack of health workers who can educate about potential side effects, ineffective campaign to convince women and their families about the value of smaller families. Along with that, the overall social norms of society where women seldom control decisions about their own fertility also play a major role. The single most important factor that has confounded efforts to promote family planning in Pakistan is the lack of consistent supply of commodities and services.

The unmet need for contraception has remained high at around 25% of all married women of reproductive age (higher than the proportion that are using a modern contraceptive and twice as high as the number of women being served with family planning services in any given year) and historically any attempt to supply commodities has been met with extremely rapid rise (over 10% per annum) in contraception users compared with the 0.5% increase in national CPR over the past 50 years.

Currently the government contributes about a third of all FP services and the private sector including NGOs the rest. Within the private sector, franchised clinics offer higher quality health care than unfranchised clinics but there is no discernible difference between costs per client and proportion of poorest clients across franchised and unfranchised private clinics. Government programs are run by both the Ministries of Population Welfare and Health. The most common method used is condoms 33.6%, female sterilization which accounts for 33.2%, injectables 10.7%, IUD 8.8%, Pill 6.1%, lactation ammenorhea method 5.7%, others 1.9%.

Maternal and child health

The health system in Pakistan is influenced by several factors; communicable, non-communicable diseases, malnutrition in children and women and maternal and child morbidities and mortalities. Pakistan ranks on no 22 in under 5 mortality rate accounting for 81 U5M (2015) per 1000 live births, whereas infant and neonatal mortalities per 1000 live births were 66 and 46. Maternal mortality ratio is also high at 178 per 100000 live births (2015) and only 52% births were attended by skilled worker.

There is a huge imbalance in these figures. In Balochistan, for instance, the maternal mortality is 785 deaths per 100,000 live births which is nearly triple the national rate. In rural Pakistan, maternal mortality is nearly twice than that in cities. The sad reality is that 80 per cent of maternal deaths are preventable.

Undernutrition 

Nutritionally deprived children not only face difficulties in learning, but also are at prime risk of getting infections, face difficulty in combating and recovering from diseases. According to National Nutrition Survey 2018, around 40.2% children in Pakistan are stunted. There are many reasons behind that but the most important reason and one of the most contributing factors is breastfeeding (early initiation of breastfeeding, exclusive breastfeeding & continuation of breastfeeding till 2 years of age). Only 45.8% mothers started breastfeeding to their children on the first day of birth & only 48.4% mothers continued breastfeeding for exclusively 6 months (Exclusive breastfeeding). 17.7% children in Pakistan are wasted which is the very critical as per the standards of World Health Organization (WHO). Despite there are many programs working to decrease the rate of stunting and wasting in Pakistan since the last fluids (2010-2011) but there is no significant improvement in the health of the children. The prevalence of stunting was 43.7% in 2011 & it is 40.2% in 2018, which is still a critical level and the prevalence of wasting was 15.1% in 2011 and it became 17.7% in 2018, which shows the failure of all the projects working to combat undernutrition from Pakistan.

Over-nutrition (Overweight/Obesity)

Obesity is a health issue that has attracted concern only in the past few years. Urbanisation and an unhealthy, energy-dense diet (the high presence of oil and fats in Pakistani cooking), as well as changing lifestyles, are among the root causes contributing to obesity in the country. According to a list of the world's "fattest countries" published on Forbes, Pakistan is ranked 165 (out of 194 countries) in terms of its overweight population, with 22.2% of individuals over the age of 15 crossing the threshold of obesity. This ratio roughly corresponds with other studies, which state one-in-four Pakistani adults as being overweight.

Research indicates that people living in large cities in Pakistan are more exposed to the risks of obesity as compared to those in the rural countryside. Women also naturally have higher rates of obesity as compared to men. Pakistan also has the highest percentage of people with diabetes in South Asia.

According to one study, "fat" is more dangerous for South Asians than for Caucasians because the fat tends to cling to organs like the liver instead of the skin.

According to National Nutrition Survey Pakistan (NNS 2018), The study estimated the proportion of overweight children under five to be 9.5%, twice the target set by the World Health Assembly.

Malnutrition in Adolescents (10-19 years) 
Nutrition status among Adolescents (10–19 years of age) varies differently between boys & girls. In 2018, 21.1% boys and 11.8% girls are underweight, 10.2& boys & 11.4% girls are overweight &  7.7% boys and 5.5% girls are obese. More than half (56.6%) of adolescent girls in Pakistan are anaemic, however only 0.9% have severe anaemia.

Malnutrition in Women of Reproductive age (WRA) 
In Pakistan, WRA aged 15–49 years bear a double burden of malnutrition. One in seven (14.4%) are undernourished, a decline from 18% in 2011 to 14%, while overweight and obesity are increasing. In NNS 2011 28% were reported to be overweight or obese, rising to 37.8% 2018. About 41.7% of WRA are anaemic, about 79.7% WRA are vitamin D deficient, over a quarter of WRA (27.3%) are deficient in vitamin A, 18.2% of WRA are iron deficient, About 26.5% of WRA are hypocalcaemic while 0.4% are hypercalcaemic & 22.1% of WRA are zinc deficient.

Micronutrient Deficiencies in children under 5 years of age 
More than half (53.7%) of Pakistani children are anaemic and 5.7% are severely anaemic. It was 50.9% in 2001, 61.9% in 2011 and 53.7% in 2018. The prevalence of iron deficiency anaemia is 28.6%, zinc deficiency is 18.6%, vitamin A deficiency is 51.5%, vitamin D deficiency is 62.7%.

Vaccination
Some vaccines are mandatory for the residence of Pakistan including polio, BCG for childhood TB, Pentavalent vaccine (DTP+Hep B + Hib) for Diphtheria, Tetanus, Pertussis, Hepatitis B, Hib pneumonia and meningitis, Measles vaccine and rotavirus vaccine.

EPI vaccination schedule

References